Aranmula State assembly constituency is one of the 140 state legislative assembly constituencies in Kerala state in southern India. It is also one of the 7 state legislative assembly constituencies included in the Pathanamthitta Lok Sabha constituency. As of the 2021 assembly elections, the current MLA is Veena George of CPI(M).

Local self governed segments
Aranmula Niyamasabha constituency is composed of the following local self governed segments:

Members of Legislative Assembly
The following list contains all members of Kerala legislative assembly who have represented Aranmula Niyamasabha Constituency during the period of various assemblies:

Key

Election results
Percentage change (±%) denotes the change in the number of votes from the immediate previous election.

Niyamasabha Election 2021
There were 2,37,351 registered voters in Aranmula Constituency for the 2021 Kerala Niyama Sabha Election.

Niyamasabha Election 2016
There were 2,27,943 registered voters in Aranmula Constituency for the 2016 Kerala Niyama Sabha Election.

Niyamasabha election 2011 
There were 2,07,229 registered voters in Aranmula Constituency for the 2011 Kerala Niyama Sabha Election.

See also
 Aranmula
 Pathanamthitta
 Pathanamthitta district
 List of constituencies of the Kerala Legislative Assembly
 2016 Kerala Legislative Assembly election

References 

Assembly constituencies of Kerala

State assembly constituencies in Pathanamthitta district